Olle Dalman (23 June 1922 – 24 July 2007) was a Swedish alpine skier who competed in the 1948, 1952, and 1956 Winter Olympics.

He was born in Leksand, Sweden.
In 1948 he finished fifth in the alpine skiing slalom event and 41st in the downhill competition. He also participated in the combined event but was eliminated in the slalom part.

External links
 Alpine skiing 1948 

1922 births
2007 deaths
Swedish male alpine skiers
Alpine skiers at the 1948 Winter Olympics
Alpine skiers at the 1952 Winter Olympics
Alpine skiers at the 1956 Winter Olympics
Olympic alpine skiers of Sweden
20th-century Swedish people